VHS Kahloucha is a Tunisian 2006 documentary film.

Synopsis 
Moncef Kahloucha, a great fan of 1970s movies, and also a house painter, shoots hilarious feature films in VHS with the help of the inhabitants of Kazmet, a poor district in Sousse (Tunisia). He produces, directs and stars in his films which are an opportunity for the locals to get away from their dull lives and to experience unique moments, from preparation to the screening of the film in the local café. The camera follows Kahloucha shooting his latest production: Tarzan of the Arabs.

Awards 
 Damascus 2007
 FID Marseille 2007
 Vues d’Afrique 2007
 AFF Rotterdam 2007
 Dubai 2006

External links 

2006 films
Tunisian documentary films
2006 documentary films
Documentary films about African cinema
Documentary films about film directors and producers